Sam Barnard may refer to:

Sam Barnard (actor) (born 1985), British actor
Sam Barnard (jockey) (c. 1776–1846), British jockey

See also
 Sam Bernard (1863–1927), English-born American vaudeville performer
 Sam Bernardo (born 1992), Filipino television personality
 Samuel Bernard (1651–1739), French noble and financier
 San Barnard, Georgia, US